David Mao is an American law librarian. Mao served as acting Librarian of Congress from September 30, 2015, until the confirmation of Carla Hayden in 2016.

Early life 
David S. Mao was born in New York City and grew up in Lawrenceville, New Jersey where he attended the Lawrenceville School. He completed his undergraduate studies with a degree in International Affairs from the George Washington University, and went on to earn first a J.D. degree from Georgetown University Law Center and then a library and information sciences master's degree from The Catholic University of America.

Career 
Mao came to the Library of Congress in 2005, when he was hired by the American Law Division in the Congressional Research Service (CRS). Before arriving at CRS, he held positions at the Georgetown University Law Library and within the research library of the international law firm of Covington and Burling LLP. He also was an adjunct professor at the University of Maryland–College Park. In 2010, he joined the Law Library of Congress as its first Deputy Law Librarian, and then became the 23rd Law Librarian of Congress January, 2012. On January 12, 2015, Mao was appointed to the Deputy Librarian of Congress office, by then-Librarian of Congress James Billington.

As Law Librarian, Mao managed the operation and policy administration of the Law Library of Congress, which contains the world's largest collection of legal materials and serves as the leading research center for foreign, comparative, and international law. During his tenure as Law Librarian, he brought to the Library a copy of the 1215 Magna Carta for a historic exhibition on the eve of the charter's 800th anniversary.

Mao served as acting Librarian of Congress from September 30, 2015, until the confirmation of Carla Hayden in 2016. He is the first Asian-American to hold the position.

In 2017 he became the chief operating officer of his alma mater, Georgetown University Law School.

References

External links

Librarians of Congress
Law librarians
University of Maryland, College Park faculty
Catholic University of America alumni
Elliott School of International Affairs alumni
Georgetown University Law Center alumni
Lawrenceville School alumni
Living people
New Jersey lawyers
Lawyers from New York City
Year of birth missing (living people)
American librarians of Chinese descent